This is a list of the Hitkrant Europarade number-one singles of 1982.

1982 record charts
Lists of number-one songs in Europe